Frederika Henriëtte Broeksmit (1875–1945) was a Dutch artist and peace activist.

Biography
Broeksmit was born on 14 August 1875 in Rotterdam. She was a member of De Independents, and Arti et Amicitiae.

Broeksmit exhibited her work at the Brussels International Exhibition of 1910. Broeksmit's work was included in the 1939 exhibition and sale Onze Kunst van Heden (Our Art of Today) at the Rijksmuseum in Amsterdam.

Broeksmit was a pacifist. She founded the organization Si vis Pacem, para Pacem (If you want peace, prepare for Peace). In 1915 she attended the International Congress of Women at the Hague.

Broeksmit died on 25 January 1945  in Bussum.

References

External links

1875 births
1945 deaths
Dutch women painters
20th-century Dutch women artists
20th-century Dutch painters
Painters from Rotterdam